Jean-Paul Akono (born 1 January 1952) is a Cameroonian football coach and former player.

Early and personal life
Akono was born on 1 January 1952 in Yaoundé.

Playing career
Akono played for Cameroon at international level, participating in the 1972 African Cup of Nations, and appearing in one FIFA World Cup qualifying match in 1973. He played club football for Canon Yaoundé between 1979 and 1980.

Coaching career
Akono was in charge of Cameroon at the 2000 Summer Olympics.

He was appointed to manage the Cameroon national team on an interim basis in September 2012. In April 2013 it was announced that the Cameroonian Football Association had begun the process of finding a permanent replacement for Akono. Akono later stated he was "shocked and embarrassed" that they were replacing him, and that he would not be applying for the job on a permanent basis. The Cameroonian Football Association later announced that Akono would remain in charge for forthcoming World Cup qualifying matches in June 2013, although they would continue their search for a replacement due to Akono's illness; he was replaced by German Volker Finke a few days later.

References

1952 births
Living people
Footballers from Yaoundé
Cameroonian footballers
Cameroon international footballers
Canon Yaoundé players
Association football midfielders
Cameroonian football managers
Cameroon national football team managers
Chad national football team managers
Cameroonian expatriate football managers
Expatriate football managers in Chad
1972 African Cup of Nations players